Cypselocarpus is a genus of flowering plants belonging to the family Gyrostemonaceae.

Its native range is Southwestern Australia.

Species:
 Cypselocarpus haloragoides (F.Muell. ex Benth.) F.Muell.

References

Gyrostemonaceae
Brassicales genera